The Social Democratic Party (Partido Social-Democrata) is a political party in Angola. The party was founded in Luanda on November 16, 1988. The party is led by Bengui Pedro João.

Sources
 UNHCR.org: Social Democratic Party (Angola)

Political parties in Angola
Social democratic parties in Angola
Political parties established in 1988
1988 establishments in Angola